Human is the fifth studio album by American pop rock band OneRepublic. It was released through Mosley Music Group and Interscope Records on August 27, 2021, nearly five years after their fourth album Oh My My (2016). After the health issues that affected the band's lead singer, songwriter and producer Ryan Tedder, OneRepublic decided to work on a standalone singles strategy to promote the album. With that, Human deals with lyrical themes surrounding the COVID-19 pandemic, as well as life and the connectivity between humanity and nature.

Human includes electronic production consisting of drum machines, synthesizers and manipulated vocals. In addition to the band's own Tedder and Brent Kutzle, OneRepublic recruited producers Steve Wilmot and Zach Skelton, who worked on the band's previous album, as well as producers Tyler Spry and John Nathaniel.

Six singles supported the album: "Rescue Me", "Wanted", "Didn't I", "Better Days", "Run", "Someday" also including the singles "Lose Somebody" and "Wild Life", released as bonus tracks on the Digital Deluxe edition of the album. "Somebody to Love" preceded the album as a promotional single. The album polarised music critics, who admired the lyricism and composition of some tracks, but were divided over the overproduced vocals, opaque production, and the excess of rap-trap verses and melodies in much of the songs.

After a period of delays, Human peaked at number 11 on the Billboard 200 in its debut week, falling below the debut weeks of Native (2013) and Oh My My (2016) but surpassing Dreaming Out Loud (2007) and Waking Up (2009). The album also reached the top twenty in Australia, Austria, Belgium, Canada, Germany, New Zealand, Scotland, and Switzerland.

Background
The album was announced by frontman Ryan Tedder in September 2019, with a planned release in "late November" of that year. Tedder stated that he wanted to put out an album with eight or nine songs and then continue releasing new music in 2020. Tedder later revealed that the album had been delayed until the second quarter of 2020 because it was "physically impossible to finish an album in the timeframe that we thought we needed it", and he believed the album would not be successful if released between Thanksgiving and Christmas. Tedder also said the band had "two years worth of songs just scattered on hard drives" and were trying to find and finish "the best ones" to make "a coherent album out of the last two years". Tedder stated that the May 8 release date was delayed because of it being a "weird time", amid the COVID-19 pandemic.
The band also stated, "due to the current circumstances requiring us to distance ourselves from each other and you, the release has been postponed." On July 1, 2021, the band announced via their Instagram account that the official release date for Human would be August 27, 2021.

Singles
The lead single "Rescue Me" was released on May 17, 2019, and reached number five on the US Billboard Bubbling Under Hot 100. "Wanted" was released as the second single on September 6, 2019, and reached number nine on the Bubbling Under Hot 100. The third single "Didn't I" was released alongside the album pre-order on March 13, 2020, and reached number 19 on the Bubbling Under Hot 100. "Better Days" was released as the fourth single on March 25, 2020. "Run" was released as the fifth single on May 5, 2021, and reached number 11 on the Bubbling Under Hot 100. "Someday" was released as the sixth single on August 27, 2021, along with the album's release.

Promotional single
The album also includes the promotional single "Somebody to Love", released on September 11, 2019. It was written by songwriter JT Roach on the series Songland, on which Tedder serves as a judge.

Other songs
"Lose Somebody", a collaboration with Kygo, was released on May 15, 2020, and reached number 88 on the US Billboard Hot 100. It appears on Kygo's third studio album Golden Hour. "Wild Life" was released on September 25, 2020, for the soundtrack of the 2020 film, Clouds. Both songs also appear on the deluxe edition of the Human.

Critical reception

Human polarized music critics upon release. Much of it was divided on Tedder's production and vocals on several tracks, while the lyricism and melodies were praised on certain tracks and received negatively on others due to the excess of rap-trap verses.

Neil Z. Yeung of AllMusic called the album proof that OneRepublic are still the "masters of the galloping, upbeat pop anthem, packing whistles, handclaps, throbbing basslines, and dance beats into every second of a song" but also mentions that "by including tracks that have been around since 2019, much of the effort feels like a time capsule of days gone by (especially in such an ever-changing genre) and, in a harsher sense, of dated material that can sound out of place when presented as a whole vision years later". Vinyl Chapters Zoë Andrea-Lykourgou wrote that "Human is a solid album that starts and ends considerably strongly. It's relatively easy to listen to and, whilst the quality does vary in places, there are more than a few powerful tracks that keep the listener interested throughout".

Track listing

Notes
  signifies a co-producer
  signifies an additional producer

Charts

Weekly charts

Year-end charts

Certifications

References

2021 albums
Albums postponed due to the COVID-19 pandemic
Albums produced by Ryan Tedder
Interscope Records albums
OneRepublic albums
OneRepublic